The Balko Independent School District is a school district based in Balko, Oklahoma United States. It contains a single K-12 school, the Balko Independent School.

See also
 List of school districts in Oklahoma

References

External links
 Balko Overview

School districts in Oklahoma
Education in Beaver County, Oklahoma